The Lo Nuestro Award for Pop New Artist of the Year  is an honor presented annually by American television network Univision. It was first awarded in 1989 and has been given annually since to recognize the most talented performers of Latin music. The nominees and winners were originally selected by a voting poll conducted among program directors of Spanish-language radio stations in the United States and also based on chart performance on Billboard Latin music charts, with the results being tabulated and certified by the accounting firm Deloitte. At the present time, the winners are selected by the audience through an online survey. The trophy awarded is shaped in the form of a treble clef.

The award was first presented to French group Gipsy Kings. Kaoma won the following year, aided by their hit song "Lambada" which sold five-million units worldwide. American performer Christina Aguilera won both the Grammy Award for Best New Artist in 2000 and the Lo Nuestro for Pop New Artist the following year. Spanish singer David Bisbal, winner in 2004, is the only performer also being awarded the Latin Grammy Award for Best New Artist; while 2008 nominee Alexander Acha also earned New Artist accolade at the 10th Latin Grammy Awards. Singer-songwriters Lena Burke, Alexandre Pires and Álex Ubago were nominated for New Artist of the Year as a solo performers and as the group Alex, Jorge y Lena and Só Pra Contrariar, respectively, losing on both instances. Enrique Iglesias, Jon Secada and Shakira won for Best New Artist at the Lo Nuestro Awards and also earned the Grammy Award for Best Latin Pop Album.

American singer Jennifer Lopez and Canadian performer Nelly Furtado were previously nominees for a Lo Nuestro Award before being awarded. Lopez was up for Pop Female Artist of the Year in 2000, while Furtado was a nominee for Pop Group or Duo of the Year along Colombian singer-songwriter Juanes at the 2004 ceremony. Mexican actress Eiza González won in 2009 for her singing role in the TV series Lola...Érase una vez. Spanish singer Natalia Jimenez was previously awarded the Lo Nuestro Award for Pop Album of the Year as a part of the duo La 5ª Estación and in 2012 won for Best New Artist. In 2013 the Pop, Regional Mexican and Tropical Salsa New Artist of the Year categories were merged on a Lo Nuestro Award for Best New Artist category in the General Field. For the Lo Nuestro Awards of 2014, the Pop New Artist of the Year award was reinstated and merged again the following year.

Winners and nominees
Listed below are the winners of the award for each year, as well as the other nominees for the majority of the years awarded.

See also
 Latin Grammy Award for Best New Artist

References

Pop music awards
Music awards for breakthrough artist
Pop New Artist of the Year
Awards established in 1989
Awards disestablished in 2014